In enzymology, an ureidoglycolate hydrolase is an enzyme that catalyzes the chemical reaction

(S)-ureidoglycolate + H2O  glyoxylate + 2 NH3 + CO2

Thus, the two substrates of this enzyme are (S)-ureidoglycolate and H2O, whereas its 3 products are glyoxylate, NH3, and CO2.

This enzyme belongs to the family of hydrolases, those acting on carbon-nitrogen bonds other than peptide bonds, specifically in linear amidines.  The systematic name of this enzyme class is (S)-ureidoglycolate amidohydrolase (decarboxylating). This enzyme participates in purine metabolism.

Structural studies

References

 

EC 3.5.3
Enzymes of known structure